Malčice is a village and municipality in Michalovce District in the Kosice Region of eastern Slovakia.

History
In historical records the village was first mentioned in 1274 .

Geography
The village lies at an altitude of 120 metres and covers an area of  (2020-06-30/-07-01).

Culture
The village has a public library and a football pitch.

Gallery

See also
 List of municipalities and towns in Michalovce District
 List of municipalities and towns in Slovakia

References

External links

Statistics.sk
Malcice.sk

Villages and municipalities in Michalovce District